The World Pea Shooting Championships have been held annually since 1971 on the second Saturday in July, in the village of Witcham near Ely in Cambridgeshire, England, and has attracted competitors from as far afield as the USA, Canada, Scandinavia, France, Spain, New Zealand and Holland.

Both the 2020 and 2021 events have been cancelled due to the COVID-19 pandemic, and the 2022 event has also been cancelled due to fears that the activity may spread Covid-19

Rules
Peas are shot at a 12 inch target smeared with glazing putty, 12 feet away, with a peashooter not exceeding 12 inches in length, there are no restrictions to technology providing the pea is propelled by blowing with the mouth, also, anyone can enter.

History
The World Pea Shooting Championship was conceived in 1971 as a fund-raising idea for the building of a modern Village Hall by the headmaster of the village school, John I. Tyson (1925–2002), however, the school is long since closed, and children from Witcham now go to primary school in nearby Mepal. In 2003, the Parish Council funded the purchase of the John Tyson Shield on which the open champion's name is recorded each year.

The competition tends to be dominated by local entrants, though a small number travel from around the world, notably the United States, and American personnel from the nearby US airbases of RAF Mildenhall and RAF Lakenheath have competed.  The day is combined with village fete featuring games, stalls, and more.

Both the 2020 and 2021 events have been cancelled due to the COVID-19 pandemic.

The 2022 event has also been cancelled due to fears that activity itself, involving high velocity discharge from the mouth, has a high likelihood of spreading Covid-19 to other contenders and referees. The event is expected to make a return in 2023.

Recent champions

In 2010, Ian Ashmeade became the 40th World Pea Shooting Champion. In 2011, he retained the title beating four-time World Champion George Hollis in the semifinal, and 2009 champion Jim Collins in the final.

In 2011, Emma Watson became the Ladies' World Pea Shooting Champion despite it being the very first time she had picked up a pea shooter.

In 2012,  Julie Bissmire beat Tina Pullman to win the Women's event.  In the open event, Rob Bresler defeated the 2010 and 2011 champion, Ian Ashmeade, in the quarterfinals, and Jim Collins in the final.

In 2013, the ladies title went to Helen Phillips. Rob Bresler won the open event again in 2013, defeating Toby Bush in the final.

In 2014, Rob Bresler saw off 61 other competitors to retain his title. Also in 2014, Michelle Berry won the ladies title, while the junior title went to Haddenham's Martha Collins.

In 2016, at the 46th World Peashooting championships, Michelle Berry made history by regaining her Ladies title for the third consecutive year, using a laser shooter made by her father. She fought her way through a strong field, while also reaching the semi-finals in the Open championship category. After a very tense final, which went into extra time, Jim Collins went on to beat Rob Bresler to take the title of Open champion, also the third title in his career.

In 2017, incredibly for the fourth consecutive year, Michelle Berry kept her title by winning the Ladies Champion category, Martha Collins was runner-up. Jim Collins beat Ian Ashmeade in the open event. Martha Collins won the junior title beating Madeline Bresler the runner-up. In the team event the Haddenham Easy Riders beat Stockport Massive to the team title.

In 2018, after unveiling a new pub sign at The White Horse, Ian Ashmeade in his iconic horned helmet thrashed the 2017 Champion Jim Collins to take the 48th World Pea Shooting title after 7 years of trying. His team, the Haddenham Easy Riders, also took the team first place, only just in front of the ladies' team Pea-u-tiful featuring Ian's girlfriend Sally Redman-Davies. Sally then went on, at her first attempt, to beat the 2017 ladies' World Champion Michelle Berry in a tense final. She only missed 1 peaseye out of 10 with a score of 48/50 in the final - what a debut!

World Pea Shooting Championship results (WPSC) 1971 onwards
Note: All results taken from http://www.witcham.org.uk/_sgg/m1m6s6_1.htm

Roll of Honour (Multiple World Champions)

Mike Fordham 8, George Hollis 4, Helen Trent 4, Jim Collins 4, Michelle Berry 4, Sandra Ashley 4, Ian Ashmeade 4, Martha Collins 4, David Hollis 3, Julie Bissmire 3, Rob Bresler 3, Robert Norman 3, Dennis Minett 3, Dan Sargent  2, Leslie Setchell 2, Neville Burniston 2, Sally Redman-Davies 2.

References

External links
The World Pea Shooting Championships 2019 by Britclip

Pea Shooting
Sport in Cambridgeshire